Christos Stergiakas is a Greek rower from Kastoria. Along with Stefanos Ntouskos, he won a gold medal for Greece, at the 2018 Mediterranean Games.

References

Greek male rowers
Living people
1999 births
Mediterranean Games gold medalists for Greece
Mediterranean Games medalists in rowing
Competitors at the 2018 Mediterranean Games
Rowers from Kastoria